Events in the year 2017 in the United Arab Emirates.

Incumbents
 President: Khalifa bin Zayed Al Nahyan
 Prime Minister: Mohammed bin Rashid Al Maktoum

Events

14-20 January – In the 2017 Desert T20 Challenge, hosted by the Emirates, the Afghanistan cricket team defeated Ireland in the final.
6-16 December – scheduled dates for the 2017 FIFA Club World Cup to be hosted by the Emirates

Deaths 
6 July – Giovanni Bernardo Gremoli, Roman Catholic prelate, Vicar Apostolic of Arabia (b. 1926).
11 July – Abdullah Hayayei, paralympic athlete (b. 1980)

References

 
Years of the 21st century in the United Arab Emirates
United Arab Emirates
United Arab Emirates
2010s in the United Arab Emirates